Cieszyno may refer to the following places:
Cieszyno, Drawsko County in West Pomeranian Voivodeship (north-west Poland)
Cieszyno, Łobez County in West Pomeranian Voivodeship (north-west Poland)
Cieszyno, Świdwin County in West Pomeranian Voivodeship (north-west Poland)